Kelvin Darnell Hayden Jr. (born July 23, 1983) is a former American football cornerback. He played college football at Illinois and was drafted by the Indianapolis Colts in the second round of the 2005 NFL Draft. In Super Bowl XLI he returned a Rex Grossman interception (the first of his career) 56 yards for a touchdown in a win over his hometown team, the Chicago Bears. Hayden also played for the Bears and the Atlanta Falcons.

Early years
Hayden attended Chicago's Hubbard High School, where he was a four-year starter in football. As a freshman cornerback, he was a first-team All-PowerBar team selection and an All-Area selection after posting ten interceptions. As a sophomore quarterback, he passed for 21 touchdowns and rushed for seven more scores.

Hayden was a Chicago Bears fan during his youth.

College career

Joliet Junior College
Hayden attended Joliet Junior College for two years, where he finished his career with 115 receptions for 1,839 yards (16.13 yards per rec. avg.) and 17 touchdowns and was a two-time All-Conference and an All-Region pick.  After losing his first junior college game, he led Joliet JC to 21 consecutive victories and the 2002 NJCAA National Championship.

As a sophomore, he was the NJCAA National Offensive National Player of the Year, won first-team JC All-America accolades, and was named the Conference Player of the Year, after making 72 receptions for 1,297 yards(18.1 yards per rec. avg.) and 13 touchdowns. He was also named the MVP of the 2002 NCAA National Championship game. As a freshman, he made 42 receptions for 542 yards (12.9 yards per rec. avg.) and four touchdowns. He then transferred to Illinois.

University of Illinois
In 2003, Hayden led the Fighting Illini in receptions and receiving yards with 52 receptions for 592 yards. Prior to the 2004 season, he switched to cornerback. He started all 11 games and had 71 tackles and four interceptions.

Professional career

2005 NFL Draft
Hayden was drafted in the second round (60th overall) by the Indianapolis Colts.

Indianapolis Colts (2005–2010)
In his second season, Hayden recorded his first career interception in Super Bowl XLI when he took a Rex Grossman pass 56 yards for a touchdown, en route to a Colts 29-17 victory over the Chicago Bears. His stats as a Colt were 239 total tackles and 9 interceptions, including three returned for touchdowns. Hayden also scored a touchdown on a 26-yard fumble recovery in a game against the Philadelphia Eagles during the 2006 season.

Atlanta Falcons (2011)
Hayden had 16 total tackles and two interceptions during his one-year tenure in Atlanta.

Chicago Bears (2012–2014)
On April 5, 2012, he signed with the Chicago Bears on a 1-year contract worth $825,000. In Week 9 against the Tennessee Titans, Hayden recovered two forced fumbles. In 2012, Hayden and four other players led the league in defensive fumble recoveries with four. Despite becoming an unrestricted free agent in 2013, on March 26, Hayden signed a one-year deal to return to the Bears. On August 7, 2013, the Bears announced that Hayden suffered a torn hamstring and would miss the entire 2013 season. The injury occurred during Family Fest practice at Soldier Field on August 3, 2013. Hayden was eventually placed on injured reserve. Hayden became a free agent after the 2013 season, but was resigned on February 28, 2014. On August 30, 2014, the Bears waived him along with others during their final roster cuts. On September 2, 2014, he was re-signed by the Bears to fill an opening on the roster when wide receiver Marquess Wilson was placed on injured reserve. On September 13, 2014, the Bears released him and two others as they needed to fill some depth due to multiple injuries.

Personal life
Hayden got engaged to Taraji P. Henson on May 13, 2018, but Henson disclosed the end of the engagement during the October 19, 2020 episode of The Breakfast Club.

References

External links
 Illinois Fighting Illini bio

1983 births
Living people
Players of American football from Chicago
African-American players of American football
American football cornerbacks
American football wide receivers
Joliet Wolves football players
Illinois Fighting Illini football players
Indianapolis Colts players
Atlanta Falcons players
Chicago Bears players
21st-century African-American sportspeople
20th-century African-American people